is an island in the Sea of Japan off the northwestern tip of Hokkaidō, Japan.

Rebun Island is known for its alpine flowers and the 8-Hour Hiking Course which runs from one end of the island to the other, north to south. The hiking course can be broken into two sections, known as the 4-Hour Hiking Courses. Rebun Island is home to a chashi, or hilltop fortification of the Ainu people. The highest point on the island is Mount Rebun. The island is part of the Rishiri-Rebun-Sarobetsu National Park.

Fossilized remains of long-finned pilot whales that are now extinct in the north Pacific have been excavated on Rebun Island,  and remains of funerals for orcas, possibly referring them as Repun Kamuy (God of Sea/Offshore) have been found as well. Rebun Island is also the site where the last reliable record of the extinct Japanese sea lion came from in 1974.

Etymology

The name of the island comes from the Ainu language, in which "Repun" means "(island) in the open sea" (from rep "the offing, open sea" + -un "to be in ~").

Climate

Areas of interest

 Mount Rebun
 Peach Rock, or Momoiwa
 Jizo Rock
 Cat Rock, or Nekoiwa
 Cape Sukoton
 Cape Kaneda
 Cape Gorota
 Cape Sukai
 Todo Island
 Lake Kushu
 Yamunai Valley
 Rebun Forest Road
 Rebun Falls

Communities
All communities on Rebun Island are part of the town of Rebun in Rebun District. From roughly from north to south, they are:
 Sukoton
 Awabikoton
 Hamanaka
 Funadomari
 Horodomari
 Uedomari
 Nairo
 Kitousu
 Kafukai
 Kafuka
 Shiretoko

Transportation
 Ferry link to Rishiri Island, Wakkanai, and Otaru via Rishiri
 Air link to Wakkanai Airport

Ancient people 
A Jomon woman excavated from Funadomari remains (about 3,800 - 3,500 YBP) on the Rebun Island in Hokkaido belongs to Haplogroup D1b2a(D-CTS220). This discovery proved the hypothesis that Haplogroup D1b is one of the Jomon linages.

In popular culture
In the manga and anime series Food Wars!: Shokugeki no Soma, the island is the last step in the Promotion test which takes place across Hokkaido Island.

Gallery

References

External links

Islands of the Sea of Japan
Islands of Hokkaido